Jamie Forrest is a fictional character on the New Zealand soap opera Shortland Street. The character was portrayed by Karl Urban for a guest stint in mid-1993 before returning later in the year for a 6-month recurring stint. The character is remembered as the first openly gay character on the show.

Creation and casting
In 1992 Shortland Street planned for character Stuart Neilson to be gay however the plans fell through. Producers decided to break new ground by introducing the controversial character. The character appeared in a short guest stint before returning for a 6-month recurring stint.

Storylines
Jamie arrived to Shortland Street. After childhood friend Kirsty (Angela Dotchin) failed to attract Jamie, he revealed he was gay. He worked as a paramedic alongside Sam (Rene Naufahu) but was alienated due to his sexuality. The two made up and Jamie ended up leaving the hospital. He returned some months later and the teenage Jonathon McKenna (Kieren Hutchison) developed a crush on him that eventually evolved into a love affair. Jonathon's father Michael (Paul Gittins) was heavily against the two's relationship and ended up temporarily disowning his son. Michael saved the couple from a group of homophobes but the two ended up breaking up. Jamie found solace being an advocate for HIV and gay rights before he eventually reconciled with Jonathon. However, when Jamie decided to move to Christchurch and travel the world, the two broke up and made peace.

Reception
Jamie is remembered as the first ever openly homosexual character on the show. His romance with Jonathon proved both controversial and groundbreaking. It helped educate New Zealanders on homosexuality and even helped a confused teenager accept his sexuality. In 2017 stuff.co.nz journalist Fleur Mealing named Jamie as the 7h character she most wanted to return for the show's 25th anniversary, citing the need to celebrate the first openly gay character on the show whilst it was in the midst of portraying its first transgender character Blue Nathan.

References

Shortland Street characters
Fictional gay males
Television characters introduced in 1993
Fictional paramedics
Fictional LGBT characters in television
Male characters in television